George Priaux Cochrane (25 September 1877 – 31 December 1914) was an Australian rules footballer who played for the Essendon Football Club in the Victorian Football League (VFL).

In the first year of competition, he became one of the club's and leagues first premiership players, during the 1897 VFL season, under the captaincy of George Stuckey. Cochrane made his debut against  in one of the finals of the season, at the Melbourne Cricket Ground. He left the club at the end of the season to fight in the Boer War, before returning in 1901 to play 20 more games over four seasons.

"Suicide" was the finding after an inquiry into the death of George Cochrane, 37, railway employee, of Pelham street, Carlton. Evidence was given that Cochrane was found hanging in an outhouse. He had been drinking heavily for about a week. He committed suicide by hanging on 31 December 1914.

References

External links

 
 

1877 births
1914 suicides
Suicides by hanging in Australia
Essendon Football Club players
Essendon Football Club Premiership players
Collegians Football Club players
Australian rules footballers from Melbourne
People educated at Wesley College (Victoria)
1914 deaths
Australian military personnel of the Second Boer War
One-time VFL/AFL Premiership players
Suicides in Victoria (Australia)
People from Collingwood, Victoria
Military personnel from Melbourne